Badwara is a census town and Tehsil is located in Katni district in the Indian state of Madhya Pradesh. 106 villages are in Badwara Tehsil. It comes under Badwara Panchayath. It belongs to Jabalpur Division. It is located 24 km towards east from District headquarters Katni. 382 km from state capital Bhopal.

Badwara is surrounded by Katni Tehsil to the west, Murwara Tehsil to the west, Vijayraghavgarh Tehsil to the north, Chandia Tehsil to the east.

Transport
By Rail

Badwara's railway station is Rupaund Railway Station  

By Road

Badwara is located in NH-78 (Katni To Gumla)

Education

Schools in the town with Hindi and English language classes are SGPS Badwara, GGMS Badwara, Jawahar Navoday Vidhyalaya Badwara, Sharda Model Ms Badwara, Sar. Shishu Man. Badwara and Govt. Degree College Badwara. 

Tehsil in Katni